South Bedburn is a civil parish in County Durham, England. The population of the civil parish at the 2011 census was 171.

References

External links

Civil parishes in County Durham